Brachycephaly (derived from the Ancient Greek βραχύς, 'short' and κεφαλή, 'head') is the shape of a skull shorter than typical for its species. It is perceived as a desirable trait in some domesticated dog and cat breeds, notably the pug and Persian, and can be normal or abnormal in other animal species. In humans, the cephalic disorder is known as flat head syndrome, and results from premature fusion of the coronal sutures, or from external deformation.  The coronal suture is the fibrous joint that unites the frontal bone with the two parietal bones of the skull. The parietal bones form the top and sides of the skull.  This feature can be seen in Down syndrome.

In anthropology, human populations have been characterized as either dolichocephalic (long-headed), mesaticephalic (moderate-headed), or brachycephalic (short-headed). The usefulness of the cephalic index was questioned by Giuseppe Sergi, who argued that cranial morphology provided a better means to model racial ancestry.

There are also cases of brachycephaly associated with plagiocephaly. Brachycephaly with plagiocephaly is positional and has become more prevalent since the "Back to Sleep" campaign. The Back to Sleep campaign began in 1994 as a way to educate parents about ways to reduce the risk for sudden infant death syndrome (SIDS). The campaign was named for its recommendation to place healthy babies on their backs to sleep. Placing babies on their backs to sleep reduces the risk for SIDS, also known as "cot death" or "crib death." This campaign has been successful in promoting infant back sleeping and other risk-reduction strategies to parents, family members, child care providers, health professionals, and all other caregivers of infants, at a cost of increasing the incidence of this deformation of the head. It is considered a cosmetic problem. Many pediatricians remain unaware of the issue and possible treatments. Treatments include regular prone repositioning of babies ("tummy time").

Brachycephaly as a desired trait
Brachycephaly also describes a developmentally normal type of skull with a high cephalic index, such as in snub-nosed breeds of dog such as pugs, Shih Tzus, and bulldogs or cats such as the Persian, Exotic and Himalayan. The term is from Greek roots meaning 'short' and 'head'. While being a desirable trait of specific cat and dog breeds, the production and breeding of brachycephalic animals is technically considered as an animal abuse in some legislations. This arises from the fact that animals with significantly shortened skulls frequently develop brachycephalic airway obstructive syndrome, causing them to have difficulties when breathing, suffering from hyperthermia due to insufficient cooling abilities and frequent infections of the cornea and lacrimal glands. Breeding of animals that will have significantly worsened life quality due to anatomical abnormalities is clearly stated to be illegal in some European countries, yet the production of such breeds is still very frequent. Apart from these, brachycephalic pups and kittens also have high prenatal mortality. Attention should be paid to breed standards which promote increased brachycephaly in cats which has the potential to negatively impact their welfare, and potential buyers of brachycephalic cat breeds should be made aware of the risks of their conformation.

Diagnosis

Treatment
Brachycephaly can be corrected with a cranial remolding orthoses (helmet) which provide painless total contact over the prominent areas of the skull and leave voids over the flattened areas to provide a pathway for more symmetrical skull growth. Treatment generally takes 3–4 months, but varies depending on the infant's age and severity of the cranial asymmetry.

However, studies by scientists in the Netherlands have found there was no significant difference over time between infants treated with helmets and infants left untreated. All parents of infants treated with helmets confirmed negative side effects including skin irritation and sweating.
This study focused only on patients with mild to moderate cases, the participation rate was only 21%, and there was a 73% reporting of fitting issues, calling into question the validity of the study. Incorrectly fit devices cannot be expected to yield results. Additionally, independent published research that examined the effectiveness of helmet therapy concludes that as many as 95% of patients demonstrate an improvement in head shape symmetry following helmet therapy, and the American Orthotics and Prosthetics Association (AOPA) has serious concerns about the relevance and validity of this study.

See also
 Artificial cranial deformation
 Cephalic index
 Craniosynostosis
 Dolichocephaly
 Plagiocephaly
 Safe to Sleep

References

External links 
 NINDS – Cephalic Disorders Overview
 Brachycephalic Official Website
 

Congenital disorders of musculoskeletal system
Hereditary dog diseases